The oldest surviving Hebrew Bible manuscripts—including the Dead Sea Scrolls—date to about the 2nd century BCE (fragmentary) and some are stored at the Shrine of the Book in Jerusalem. The oldest extant complete text survives in a Greek translation called the Septuagint, dating to the 4th century CE (Codex Sinaiticus). The oldest extant manuscripts of the vocalized Masoretic Text (the basis of modern editions), date to the 9th century CE.
With the exception of a few biblical sections in the Prophets, virtually no biblical text is contemporaneous with the events it describes.

Internal evidence in the texts suggests dating the individual books of the 27-book New Testament canon in the 1st century CE. The first book written was probably 1 Thessalonians, written around 50 CE. The final book (in the ordering of the canon), the Book of Revelation, is generally accepted by traditional scholarship to have been written during the reign of Domitian (81–96). Dating the composition of the texts relies primarily on internal evidence, including direct references to historical events—textual criticism and philological and linguistic evidence provide more subjective indications.

Table I: Chronological overview
This table summarises the chronology of the main tables and serves as a guide to the historical periods mentioned. Much of the Hebrew Bible/Old Testament may have been assembled in the 5th century BCE. The New Testament books were composed largely in the second half of the 1st century CE. The Deuterocanonical books fall largely in between.

Table II: Hebrew Bible/Protestant Old Testament

Table III: Deuterocanonical Old Testament

Table IV: New Testament

See also
 Authorship of the Bible
 Biblical manuscripts
 Categories of New Testament manuscripts
 Development of the Hebrew Bible canon
 Historical criticism
 Historicity of the Bible
 Marcan priority
 Nag Hammadi library
 Synoptic problem

References

Citations

Bibliography

Further reading

 

 
 
 

 
 
 
 
 

Biblical criticism
Biblical studies
Chronology